Kuresoi South is a constituency in Kenya. Part of the former constituency of Kuresoi Community, it is one of eleven constituencies in Nakuru County. The Constituency is further divided into four wards namely; Amalo, Tinet, Kiptagich and Keringet.

Members of Parliament

References 

Constituencies in Nakuru County